Balaton is a village in Heves County, Northern Hungary Region, Hungary.

Parts
 Balaton
 Illésvölgyitanya
 Tárcatanya
 Zsólyomtanya

Sights
 The Catholic church

See also
 List of populated places in Hungary

References

External links
 

Populated places in Heves County